The 81st edition of the KNVB Cup (at the time called Amstel Cup) started on August 11, 1998. The final was played on May 13, 1999: Ajax beat Fortuna Sittard  2–0 and won the cup for the fourteenth time. A total of 61 clubs participated.

Teams
 All 18 participants of the 1998–99 Eredivisie, six of which entering in the knock-out stage
 All 18 participants of the 1998–99 Eerste Divisie
 23 teams from lower (amateur) leagues
 Two youth teams

Group stage
The matches of the group stage were played between August 11 and September 2, 1998. 55 clubs participated, 26 advanced to the next round.

E Eredivisie; 1 Eerste Divisie; A Amateur teams

Knock-out Stage

First round
The matches of the first round were played on October 27, 28 and 29, 1998. The six highest ranked Eredivisie teams from last season entered the tournament this round.

E six Eredivisie entrants

Round of 16
The matches of the round of 16 were played on February 2, 3 and 4, 1999.

Quarter finals
The quarter finals were played on March 9 and 10, 1999.

Semi-finals
The semi-finals were played on April 13 and 14, 1999.

Final
The final was played on May 13, 1999.

The Cup Winners' Cup tournament no longer existed, Ajax would now play in the UEFA Cup.

See also
Eredivisie 1998-99
Eerste Divisie 1998-99

External links
 Results by Ronald Zwiers  

1998-99
1998–99 domestic association football cups
1998–99 in Dutch football